Thomas Austin may refer to:

Thomas Austin (pastoralist) (1815–1871), English settler who introduced rabbits into Australia
Thomas Austin (American football) (born 1986), former American football center
Thomas Austin (cricketer) (1857–1941), New Zealand cricketer
Thomas Austin (civil servant) (1887–1976), British civil servant of the Indian civil service
Tom Austin (politician) (1923–2002), Australian politician

See also

Thomas Austen (1775–1859), British soldier and MP for West Kent
Austin Thomas (1939–2018), Aruban fencer